The Shannon Brook, a perennial stream of the Richmond River catchment, is located in Northern Rivers region in the state of New South Wales, Australia.

Location and features
The river descends  over its  course.

Etymology
The river is believed to be named in honour of J. C. Shannon who came from the Clarence Valley and took up Stratheden for Dr. John Dobie in 1842. He camped by the creek, hence the name Shannon Brook. J. C. Shannon was known locally as Doc Shannon.

See also

 Rivers of New South Wales
 List of rivers of New South Wales (L-Z)
 List of rivers of Australia

References

External links
 

 

Northern Rivers
Rivers of New South Wales